The 1979 Derby City Council election took place on 3 May 1979 to elect members of Derby City Council in England. This was on the same day as other local elections. Voting took place across 18 wards, each electing 3 Councillors. The Labour Party gained control of the council from the Conservative Party.

Overall results

|-
| colspan=2 style="text-align: right; margin-right: 1em" | Total
| style="text-align: right;" | 54
| colspan=5 |
| style="text-align: right;" | 113,190
| style="text-align: right;" |

Ward results

Abbey

Allestree

Alvaston

Babington

Blagreaves

Boulton

Breadsall

Chaddesden

Chellaston

Darley

Derwent

Kingsway

Litchurch

Littleover

Mackworth

Mickleover

Normanton

Osmanton

Sinfin

Spondon

References

1979 English local elections
May 1979 events in the United Kingdom
1979
1970s in Derbyshire